Iraina Mancini is a British singer, songwriter, DJ, radio host, and model.

Biography
Iraina was born in London, UK. Her father, Warren Peace, was David Bowie's childhood friend and later went on to tour with Bowie. Iraina's first band was Mancini, an electronic pop group that appeared on Channel 4's Mobile Act Unsigned, where they got discovered and recorded an album with the producer Jagz Kooner. After Mancini disbanded, Iraina moved to Liverpool and started a band called The Venus Fury with ex members of The Zutons and The Dead 60s.

Iraina is also a DJ spinning Northern Soul, early Rhythm and Blues, Ska, Funk, and Latin Boogaloo. She has played all over London and internationally at music and film festivals such as The Toronto Film Festival, Glastonbury, and The Secret Garden Party. Mancini has also played for brands such as GQ, American Express and Samsung. She also ran a popular monthly night called "Soul Box" in east London with Eddie Piller and fashion photographer Dean Chalkley. Iraina also presents her own monthly radio show on Soho Radio specializing in her love of soul and interviewing people from the world of music, fashion, art and journalism.

On June 19, 2020, electronic musicians BT and Matt Fax released a double single, 1AM in Paris / The War, featuring Iraina for the vocals of "The War", which appears in the album The Lost Art of Longing.

In 2021 Iraina returned with new solo music including singles "Shotgun" "Deep End" and "Do It (You stole the Rhythm)". Her music takes influences from 60s French cinema, Psychedelia, Serge Gainsbourg and French YeYe girls. All singles playlist and featured heavily on BBC 6 Music and Radio 2.

In 2022 she released "Undo the Blue", a single produced by Jagz kooner.

References

British women singers
British female models
British film actresses
Living people
Year of birth missing (living people)